Gray's Chinese gecko (Gekko chinensis) is a species of gecko. It is endemic to southern China (Fujian, Guangdong, Guangxi, Yunnan) and Hong Kong.

References

Gekko
Reptiles of China
Reptiles of Hong Kong
Endemic fauna of China
Reptiles described in 1842
Taxa named by John Edward Gray